Bonnevoie is an area of south-eastern Luxembourg City, in southern Luxembourg.  It is divided between the quarters of North Bonnevoie-Verlorenkost and South Bonnevoie.  It is the biggest neighbourhood in the city, with more than 15,000 inhabitants.

Famous people born in, or residents of Bonnevoie include:

 John E. Dolibois, United States ambassador to Luxembourg
 Hugo Gernsback, editor and science fiction author
 François Hentges, gymnast
 Gabriel Lippmann, French physicist and Nobel Prize laureate (1908)
 Corinne Cahen, Luxembourg Minister of Family and Integration and the Greater Region in the Bettel–Schneider ministry

Neighbourhoods of Luxembourg City